Catherine Jane McCormack (born 3 April 1972) is an English actress of stage and screen. Her film appearances include Braveheart (1995), The Land Girls (1998), Dangerous Beauty (1998), Dancing at Lughnasa (1998), Spy Game (2001), and 28 Weeks Later (2007). Her theatre work includes National Theatre productions of All My Sons (2000) and Honour (2003).

Early life 
McCormack was born in Epsom, Surrey, England. She is of part Irish ancestry as one of her grandfathers was Irish. Her mother died of lupus when McCormack was six years old and her steelworker father subsequently raised her and her brother Stephen. She was brought up as Roman Catholic and attended the Convent of Our Lady of Providence. She went on to study at the Oxford School of Drama.

Career

Film 

McCormack's first important role was as the character Murron MacClannough in the multiple Academy Award-winning film Braveheart (1995). Her screen debut was as the lead in the Anna Campion-directed film Loaded (1994). She has subsequently stated that she had a "miserable time with the director (Anna Campion)... it was my first film job, I needed to be mollycoddled, I needed to be helped through it, and I wasn't. Mostly, it was a horrible experience."

After Braveheart, McCormack starred alongside Anna Friel and Rachel Weisz in David Leland's The Land Girls and had lead roles in Nils Gaup's Northstar and Marshall Herskovitz's Dangerous Beauty.  Other films include Spy Game (2001) and 28 Weeks Later. Despite being in demand, she does few films, stating that "I read very few scripts I'm passionate about... Maybe one in every twenty or thirty."

Theatre 

McCormack has shown a preference in her career for the theatre, saying that "theatre really is an actor's medium: you're on stage with no director anymore, whereas in film very rarely do you get much rehearsal other than running through the scene very quickly. Then everyone comes in and shoots it." McCormack was one of the original 2006 London cast of Patrick Barlow's play of The 39 Steps. In 2008, she performed the role of Nora in A Doll's House, directed by Peter Hall at the Theatre Royal, Bath, and also the role of Isabel Archer in a stage adaptation of The Portrait of a Lady, both of which commenced their runs in July 2008, ending in August, before transferring to the Rose Theatre in Kingston later that year.

In 2009, she appeared in the British tour of Headlong's adaptation of Six Characters in Search of an Author. In 2012, she starred as Juana Inés de la Cruz in the Royal Shakespeare Company's production of Helen Edmundson's play The Heresy of Love.

Filmography

Personal life
As of 2009 McCormack was living with her boyfriend in Richmond.

References

External links 
 
 2006 Interview with Catherine McCormack on Theatre.com
 Catherine McCormack – Life after Braveheart
 Interview with Broadway.com
 What's On Stage article about Peter Hall's 2008 plays with Catherine McCormack

1972 births
English film actresses
English television actresses
English stage actresses
English voice actresses
English radio actresses
English people of Irish descent
Alumni of the Oxford School of Drama
Living people
People from Epsom
Actresses from Surrey
20th-century English actresses
21st-century English actresses